Conrad Oberon Johnson (November 15, 1915 – February 3, 2008) was an American music educator, long associated with the city of Houston, who was inducted into the Texas Bandmasters Hall of Fame in 2000.

Born in Victoria, Texas, Conrad Johnson was nine when his family moved to Houston. Following studies at Yates High School, he attended Houston College for Negroes and graduated from Wiley College. He was an active member of Omega Psi Phi fraternity. He started his career in music education in 1941 and, following a thirty-seven-year career, retired from his position at Kashmere High School in 1978, but continued to remain active in shaping music in Houston by conducting summer programs and in-home tutoring.

Johnson was a proficient musician in his own right and, at one point, played with Count Basie. Erskine Hawkins tried to convince him to join his orchestra, but Johnson declined, citing a love of teaching and obligations to his family. Later, Johnson made his lasting contribution to music by forming the Kashmere Stage Band, a renowned school orchestra that won a number of awards during its decade-long run.

The Conrad O. Johnson School of Fine Arts at Kashmere High School is named after him.

Conrad O. Johnson died in Houston days after his former students staged a celebration in his honor. The gala Saturday night concert, which was filmed by a documentary crew, was described by the students as "the greatest 92nd birthday gift that he could have ever requested."

References

Hall of Fame profile - Texas Bandmasters Hall of Fame
Public radio feature on Johnson/Kashmere Stage Band
"Kashmere retakes the stage—Alumni of the renowned school band will honor Conrad Johnson, the man who led them", Houston Chronicle (February 1, 2008)
"Legendary jazz educator Johnson 'passed the torch'—He spent his last weekend helping his band" (includes a photograph of Conrad O. Johnson sitting in the audience), Houston Chronicle (February 4, 2008)
Stones Throw Records Interview
Documentary about Conrad O. Johnson and the Kashmere Stage Band

External links 
 Johnson, Conrad and David Goldstein. Conrad Johnson Oral History, Houston Oral History Project, December 19, 2007.

American bandleaders
People from Victoria, Texas
Musicians from Houston
1915 births
2008 deaths
Wiley College alumni
20th-century American musicians
20th-century American educators
Schoolteachers from Texas
20th-century African-American musicians
21st-century African-American people